Zalim Singh (1739-1824), sometimes refer as Zalim Singh Jhala or Zalim Singh of Kotah, was an administrator, reformer and army commander of Kota state. He was the de facto ruler of Kota State from 1770 to until his death in 1824.

Biography

Career 
In 1761, Zalim Singh was appointed the Commander of the State Force of Kota State by the ruler of Kota, Chhatar Sal Singh and sent to fight battle against the forces of Jaipur State in the field of Bhatwara.

De Facto ruler of Kota 
In 1770, the ruler of Kota State, Guman Singh died and was succeeded by his 12 years old son, Umaid Singh who ruled for a half century. During this period, Zalim Singh was the de facto ruler of Kota State and Umaid Singh was only a titular chief.

References

Sources

Further reading 
 

1739 births
1824 deaths
People from Kota, Rajasthan
History of Kota, Rajasthan